Doctrines of attribution are legal doctrines by which liability is extended to a defendant who did not actually commit the criminal act.  Examples include vicarious liability (when acts of another are imputed or "attributed" to a defendant), attempt to commit a crime (even though it was never completed), and conspiracy to commit a crime (when it is not completed or which is committed by another in the conspiracy).

References

Criminal law legal terminology
Legal doctrines and principles